Stare Miasto (lit. Old Town; German: Altstadt) is a municipal neighbourhood of the city of Szczecin, Poland, situated on the left bank of the Oder river. It is the oldest historical district in the city. As of March 2021 it had a population of 3,901.

Buildings and structures

Existent 
 Old Town Hall
 Chrobry Embankment
 Ducal Castle
 National Museum
 Szczecin Cathedral
 Szczecin Philharmonic
 Szczecin Voivodeship Office

Non-existent 
Buildings and structures destroyed during the World War II.
 Grey Castle
 Hotel Metropole
 Rudolph Karstadt Department Store
 Aronheim & Cohn Department Store
 Naumann Rosenbaum Department Store
 Leopold Juda Department Store
 Stettiner General-Anzeiger Building
 Abracham Wichenhagen Tenement House
 Friedrich Pitzschky Tenement House
 Gabriel Dahl Tenement House
 Paul Letsche Tenement House
 Konzerthaus
 Bourse of Szczecin
 Otto Secondary School for Boys
 Manzel's Fountain
 Monument to Carl Loewe

References

See also 
 Old Town Hall, Szczecin

 
Stare Miasto